uMuziwabantu Local Municipality is an administrative area in the Ugu District of KwaZulu-Natal in South Africa.

Umuziwabantu is an isiZulu name meaning "the people's home", or a home with wide open doors where everyone is welcome.

The main source of income for the area is derived from the municipality’s extensive wattle, gum, pine and poplar plantations, and associated industries, including saw mills and furniture-making factories.

Main places
The 2001 census divided the municipality into the following main places:

Politics 

The municipal council consists of twenty one members elected by mixed-member proportional representation. Eleven councillors are elected by first-past-the-post voting in eleven wards, while the remaining eleven are chosen from party lists so that the total number of party representatives is proportional to the number of votes received. In the election of 1 November 2021 the African National Congress (ANC) won a minority of 10 seats on the council as opposed to eleven seats won by the opposing parties.
The following table shows the results of the election.

By-elections from November 2021
The following by-elections were held to fill vacant ward seats in the period since the election in November 2021.

Most of ward 11 consists of the town of Harding, which was severely affected by the unrest in July 2021. A new ward, it was won by Sheikh Mondli Ncane from Al Jama-ah (AJ). An ANC coalition saw Ncane elected deputy-mayor. In June 2022, Ncane was ousted as deputy mayor, and replaced by a candidate from ANC coalition partner Abantu Batho Congress (ABC). Ncane quit his party, standing as a candidate for the Sizwe Ummah Nation (SUN) in the by-election. The seat was won by the Inkatha Freedom Party (IFP), which increased its share from 6% to 53%. Ncane got 31%, while the candidate from his previous party, AJ, got 1%.

References

External links
 http://www.umuziwabantu.org.za/

Local municipalities of the Ugu District Municipality
KwaZulu-Natal South Coast